SV DFS is a football club from Opheusden, Netherlands.

References

External links
 Official site

Multi-sport clubs in the Netherlands
Football clubs in the Netherlands
Football clubs in Gelderland
Association football clubs established in 2001
2001 establishments in the Netherlands
Sport in Neder-Betuwe